Leonid Sagalov (Kharkiv, 1910 – Moscow, 1940) was a Soviet pianist.

His fine performance in the II International Chopin Piano Competition, which earned him the 6th prize, paved the way for a concert career abroad, but he shortly afterwards settled back in Kharkiv, where he combined teaching in the city's Conservatory with a concert career along the Ukrainian SSR. Just a year after he was appointed a professor, the Nazi capture of Kharkiv forced him to flee to Moscow, where he died in unknown circumstances.

External links
 Leonid Sagalov at the Chopin Information Centre.

Male classical pianists
1910 births
1940 deaths
Prize-winners of the International Chopin Piano Competition
Soviet classical pianists
Soviet composers